"Saint Claude" is a song by Christine and the Queens. It was released as a digital download on 14 April 2014 through Because Music, Neon Gold Records, and Atlantic Records as the second single from his debut studio album Chaleur Humaine (2014). The song was written by Héloïse Letissier and his debut US release.

The song was released alongside an extended play of the same name, featuring four songs from Chaleur humaine and "The Loving Cup", a song from the previous single/EP "Nuit 17 à 52".

Critical reception
Brennan Carley of ''Spin" called the EP "a masterclass in orchestral layering and attention-grabbing lyricism."

Music video
A music video to accompany the release of "Saint Claude" was first released onto YouTube on 29 April 2014 at a total length of three minutes and forty-two seconds. It won Music video of the year at the Victoires de la Musique.

Track listing

Charts

Weekly charts

Year-end charts

Release history

References

2014 singles
2014 songs
Christine and the Queens songs
Because Music singles
Songs written by Héloïse Letissier
Christine and the Queens albums
2015 EPs
Because Music albums
Atlantic Records EPs
Atlantic Records singles